Omar Félix Colomé (December 11, 1932 – July 12, 2015) was an Argentine Roman Catholic bishop.

Ordained to the priesthood in 1962, Colomé was named bishop of the Roman Catholic Diocese of Cruz del Eje in 1984.  In 2006, he formed the Society of St. John, a Society of Apostolic Life.

Colomé retired in 2008 and died in 2015.

Notes

 Falleció el exobispo de Cruz del Eje Félix Colomé
 COLOMÉ, Omar Félix
 Murió Mons. Omar Colomé, emérito de Cruz del Eje

1932 births
2015 deaths
20th-century Roman Catholic bishops in Argentina
21st-century Roman Catholic bishops in Argentina
Roman Catholic bishops of Cruz del Eje